Hyacinthe Libelli, O.P. (1616 – 23 October 1684) was a Roman Catholic prelate who served as Archbishop of Avignon (1673–1684).

Biography
Hyacinthe Libelli was born in Citta di Castello, Italy in 1616 and ordained a priest in the Order of Preachers . From 1630 to 1634 he was a student at the College of Saint Thomas, the future Pontifical University of St. Thomas Aquinas, the Angelicum, in Rome. In 1644 he was made a Doctor of Sacred Theology at the college. 
On 30 January 1673, he was appointed during the papacy of Pope Clement X as Archbishop of Avignon.
On 24 February 1673, he was consecrated bishop by Gasparo Carpegna, Cardinal-Priest of San Silvestro in Capite, with Stefano Brancaccio, Bishop of Viterbo e Tuscania, and Carlo Vaini, Titular Archbishop of Nicaea, serving as co-consecrators. 
He served as Archbishop of Avignon until his death on 23 October 1684.

Episcopal succession
While bishop, he was the principal co-consecrator of:
Simon Gaudenti, Bishop of Ossero (1673); 
Andrea Francolisio, Bishop of Tricarico (1673); and 
Giuseppe di Giacomo, Bishop of Bovino (1673).

References

External links and additional sources
 (for Chronology of Bishops) 
 (for Chronology of Bishops)  

17th-century Roman Catholic archbishops in France
Bishops appointed by Pope Clement X
1616 births
1684 deaths
Dominican bishops
Archbishops of Avignon